Denise Glaser (30 November 30, 1920 - 6 June 1983), was a French television producer and presenter, best known for presenting the musical show Discorama from 1959 to 1975.

Homage

There is a Denise-Glaser street in Valenciennes in the town where she is buried. The decision was approved in October 2014.

References

1920 births
1983 deaths
People from Arras
French television producers
French women television presenters